Mabel Shaw (1889-1973) was an English missionary and educator in Northern Rhodesia. In her time "she was the most renowned missionary in Africa".

Life
Shaw was born in 1889 in Wolverhampton. She was the first born child of Elizabeth Anne, born Purchase and Matthew Shaw who would have four more children. Her father managed a tea-shop. When she was five she went to live with her grandmother and when she was ten she went to boarding school where she adopted her life long faith in Christianity.

She was trained over four years as a missionary in Edinburgh at Ann Hunter Small's Women's Missionary Training College.

Shaw founded the Mbereshi Girls' School, a mission boarding school at Mbereshi which was the first girls' school in Northern Rhodesia. She served as its Principal until 1940.

Her papers are held at the School of Oriental and African Studies.

She died in 1972 in Guildford when she was poor and no longer well known. Her admirers and mourners in Africa raised money to have her remains returned to Zambia.

Works
 Children of the Chief. LMS Gift Book for 1921.
 Dawn in Africa: Stories of Girl Life. Edinburgh House Press, 1927.
 God's Candlelights: An Educational Venture in Northern Rhodesia. Edinburgh House Press, 1932.
 A Treasure of Darkness: An Idyll of African Child Life. Longmans, 1936.

References

1889 births
1973 deaths
English Christian missionaries
Protestant missionaries in Zambia
Women religious writers
English theologians
Missionary educators
School founders